Hendrik Elisson (23 May 1892, in Kudina Parish, Tartu County – ?) was an Estonian politician. He was a member of III Riigikogu.

References

1892 births
Members of the Riigikogu, 1926–1929
Year of death missing